K. M. Radha Krishnan is an Indian music composer who composes music for Tollywood films. Some of his most notable films are Anand, Godavari and Chandamama. In 2006, he was awarded Nandi Award by Andhra Pradesh state government  and many other awards for the movie  Godavari. He was a Nandi award jury member in 2010 .  Radha Krishnan is expert in Carnatic and Hindustani music.

K. M. Radha Krishnan's later movies are Manasu Palike Mouna Raagam, Bhale Dongalu, Baladur, Siddu From Sikakulam, and many more. He also composed jingles for television ads. He has composed some devotional albums.

Background

K. M. Radha Krishnan was born in Wanaparthy and studied till 3rd class over there. Then he went to Coimbatore and returned after a few years to complete schooling in Gadwal. Basic inspiration for him to become a musician is his father KV Mohan who worked for All India Radio since 1973. His father used to sing light music and also a stage actor. His father has given over 500 stage shows so far. His father inspired him to learn Hindustani classical music. He practiced classical music with the help of Chaganti Lakshmi for a couple of years.  He settled in Hyderabad since his intermediate where he completed diploma in Hyderabad Music College. He also completed training for music teacher. He learnt western classical from Arnold for a couple of years. He learnt Karnatic classical music from Vengamamba. He did research on how to blend Hindustani music.

Early career

Radha Krishnan  wanted to become a singer like S. P. Balasubrahmanyam when he was a kid. After two years, he started doing analysis of songs, which made him realize that there is a music composer in him. The composer in him dominated the singer. he used to practice and improvise his father's tunes. When Radha Krishnan was looking for opportunities as music director in film industry, Sunil Kumar Reddy was making a film titled ‘Silence Please’. He did background music for that film. After a gap of two years He got another opportunity to score music for a children film called ‘Hero’.

Filmography

As Music Composer

As playback singer

 2004 - Anand
 2004 - Megham
 2006 - Godavari,  Mayabajar,Manasu Palike Mouna Raagam.- 
 2007 - Chandamama
 2008 - Siddu From Sikakulam
 2008 - Baladur

As lyricist

 2008 - Bhale Dongalu

References

Living people
Telugu people
Indian film score composers
Year of birth missing (living people)